Space Lines is a board game published by Invicta Games in 1969.

Gameplay
Space Lines is an abstract strategy game similar to Qubic.

Reviews
Galileo #11
Jeux & Stratégie #7

References

External links
 Space Lines

Board games introduced in 1969